Deadwood is a ghost town in Placer County, California.

History
Deadwood town was founded in 1852 after the gold was found in the surrounding areas.

See also
List of ghost towns in California
Deadwood, California (disambiguation)

References

External links
Information about Deadwood, Placer County at California Genealogy
Deadwood at California Ghost Towns

Ghost towns in California
California Gold Rush
Former settlements in Placer County, California